Haunted Heart is a jazz album by Renée Fleming with pianist Fred Hersch and guitarist Bill Frisell.

The title track is a 1948 song by Arthur Schwartz (music) and Howard Dietz (lyrics) which was the main hit from the musical revue Inside U.S.A..

Track listing
Haunted Heart – Howard Dietz, Arthur Schwartz
River – Joni Mitchell
When Did You Leave Heaven? – Walter Bullock, Richard A. Whiting
You've Changed – Bill Carey, Carl Fischer
Answer Me – English lyrics by Carl Sigman, original German song by Gerhard Winkler and Fred Rauch
My Cherie Amour – Henry Cosby, Stevie Wonder
In My Life – John Lennon, Paul McCartney
The Moon's A Harsh Mistress – Jimmy Webb
Wozzeck - Alban Berg / Improvisation - Fred Hersch / The Midnight Sun – J. Francis Burke, Lionel Hampton
Liebst du um Schonheit (Rückert Lieder No. 5) Mahler 
My One and Only Love – Mack Gordon Robert Mellin / This Is Always - Harry Warren, Guy Wood
Cançao do Amor, for voice & orchestra (arranged from :pt:A Floresta do Amazonas), A. 546 Dora Vasconcellos, Heitor Villa-Lobos
Psyché – Emile Paladilhe
Hard Times Come Again No More – Stephen Foster

Charts

References

2005 albums
Renée Fleming albums